Dănuț is a Romanian male given name, typically a nickname for Daniel or Dan, and may refer to:

Dănuț Borbil (born 1973), professional Romanian armwrestler, current national champion for the left arm, vice-champion for the right arm
Dănuț Coman (born 1979), former Romanian goalkeeper
Dănuț Dobre (born 1967), retired Romanian rower
Ioan Dănuț Dovalciuc (born 1984), Romanian bobsledder from Suceava who has competed since 2005
Dănuț Dumbravă (born 1981), former Romanian rugby union footballer and current head coach of CSA Steaua București
Dănuț Grecu (born 1950), retired Romanian artistic gymnast who specialized in rings
Dănuț Lupu (born 1967), Romanian former football midfielder and former Hockey player in his childhood
Dănuț Marcu (born 1952), Romanian mathematician and computer scientist
Dănuț Matei, (born 1966), Romanian former professional footballer
Dănuț Moisescu (born 1972), retired Romanian football midfielder
Dănuț Moldovan (born 1991), Austrian and former Romanian bobsledder
Dănuț Oprea (born 1972), retired Romanian football player and currently manager
Dănuț Perjă (born 1974), former Romanian football defender
Dănuț Pop (born 1968), Romanian judoka
Dănuț Prodan (born 1985), Romanian former footballer
Dănuț Sabou (born 1979), retired Romanian football midfielder
Dănuț Șomcherechi (born 1973), Romanian former football player and currently a manager

Romanian masculine given names